Horse Drawn Hearse is an EP by Gnaw Their Tongues, independently released in February 2006. It would appear in its entirety on the compilation Collected Atrocities 2005–2008, released in 2015.

Track listing

Personnel
Adapted from the Horse Drawn Hearse liner notes.
 Maurice de Jong (as Mories) – vocals, instruments, recording, cover art

Release history

References

External links 
 Horse Drawn Hearse at Discogs (list of releases)

2006 EPs
Gnaw Their Tongues albums